Sillem may refer to:

In people
 Charles Sillem Lidderdale
 Aelred Sillem
 Henrik Sillem

In places
 Sillem Island, Nunavut, Canada

In other uses
 Sillem's rosefinch

nl:Sillem